Göztepe (watch hill in Turkish) may refer to:

Göztepe, Kadıköy, a neighbourhood of Kadıköy district in Istanbul, Turkey
Göztepe railway station, a train station
Göztepe (Istanbul Metro, M4), a metro station
Göztepe, Konak, a neighborhood of Konak district in İzmir, Turkey
Göztepe (İzmir Metro), a metro station
Göztepe (Tram İzmir), a tram station
Göztepe S.K., a football (soccer) club
Göztepe, Pazaryolu, a neighbourhood of Pazaryolu District of Erzurum Province, Turkey